Sarah Archer may refer to:
Sarah Archer (writer), American writer
Sarah Archer (model) (born 1990), London-based model and actress 
Sarah Archer, character in Already Dead (film)
Lady Sarah Archer, one of the Faro Ladies